The 2018–19 season was UD Almería's twentieth eighth season of existence and the fourth consecutive in Segunda División.

Squad

Transfers

In 

Total spending:  €0

Out 

Total gaining:  €0

Balance
Total:  €0

Coaches

Staff members 

Source: UD Almería's official website

Player statistics

Squad statistics 

|-
|colspan="12"|Players on loan to other clubs:

|-
|colspan="12"|Players who have left the club after the start of the season:

|}

Top scorers

Disciplinary record

Competitions

Pre-season/Friendlies

Segunda División

Results summary

Results by round

Matches

Copa del Rey

Round of 32

References 

Almeria
UD Almería seasons
2018–19 Segunda División